{{DISPLAYTITLE:C10H12N2O}}
The molecular formula C10H12N2O (molar mass 176.22 g/mol, exact mass : 176.094963) may refer to:

 Cotinine, a substance found in tobacco and also a metabolite of nicotine
 4-Methylaminorex
 PIM-35
 Serotonin